Charles M. Judd is an American social psychologist who is a College Professor of Distinction at the University of Colorado Boulder.

External links
Faculty page

Living people
American social psychologists
University of Colorado Boulder faculty
Yale University alumni
Columbia University alumni
Year of birth missing (living people)